II is the second studio album by the American rock band The Presidents of the United States of America. It was released via Columbia Records on November 5, 1996, coinciding with the United States presidential election.

Background
The album included a few songs that originally appeared on Froggystyle, a self-released cassette that was recorded before their debut album, The Presidents of the United States of America. These songs, which were re-recorded for this album, were "L.I.P", then known as "Little Indian Princess", "Lunatic to Love" and "Puffy Little Shoes". Also, "Twig" was re-recorded, as it was previously recorded as a B-side to a  "Lump" single, where it was known as "Twig in the Wind". That version was later released on Rarities as "Twig (Semi Acoustic Version)".

Track listing
All songs by The Presidents of the United States of America.

"Ladies and Gentlemen, Part 1" – 1:39
"Lunatic to Love" – 2:57
"Volcano" – 2:58
"Mach 5" – 3:15
"Twig" – 2:37
"Bug City" – 3:05
"Bath of Fire" – 2:57
"Tiki God" – 2:58
"L.I.P." – 3:20
"Froggie" – 3:10
"Toob Amplifier" – 1:22
"Supermodel" – 2:49
"Puffy Little Shoes" – 4:59
"Ladies and Gentlemen, Part 2" – 3:03
"Basketball Dream" – 0:55 (hidden track)

"Basketball Dream" features a boy, Tony Ballew (a relative of Chris Ballew), describing a dream he had about Magic Johnson - for this reason, the track is often mislabeled "Magic Johnson Dream". Chris Ballew can be heard faintly whispering the lyrics underneath the boy. The recording of Tony's voice, with a different musical backing, previously appeared on Feel Good, an album by Ballew's pre-PUSA band Egg, in 1987.

Personnel
The Presidents of the United States of America
Chris Ballew – basitar, bass, lead vocals, keyboards
Dave Dederer – guitbass, guitar, background vocals
Jason Finn – drums, percussion, background vocals

Additional personnel
Dave Thiele - piano, percussion 
Tony Ballew – baby voice on "Basketball Dream"
Mark Sandman – tritar on "Froggie"
S. Craig Montgomery – co-producing, engineering
Wally Traugott – mastering
Lance Mercer – photography
Jerry Finn – mixing
Doug Erb – art directing
Tom Smurdon – assistant engineering

Charts

Weekly charts

Year-end charts

Certifications

References

1996 albums
The Presidents of the United States of America (band) albums
Columbia Records albums